The New Zealand Walking Access Commission Ara Hīkoi Aotearoa is a crown agent. Its function is to help negotiate, establish, maintain, and improve public access to the outdoors. It works with other agencies, local groups and communities to create and tend to tracks and trails. The Commission was renamed Herenga ā Nuku Aotearoa, the Outdoor Access Commission, from 28 July 2022. 

Much of the commission's work is helping to resolve disputes over access to land or negotiating new access.

Although it is called the Walking Access Commission it also works on public access to the outdoors for other outdoor users including mountain bikers, anglers, hunters, horse riders, trail runners, climbers and landowners. The commission administers a national strategy on outdoor access. It develops and shares maps of outdoor access. It provides these maps and other information to the public, and it educates about people's public access rights and responsibilities in the outdoors.

The commission has a small staff in Wellington and a network of regional field advisers located around the country. It is governed by an independent board of six members appointed by the minister.

The commission's functions are described in the Walking Access Act 2008.

See also
Public sector organisations in New Zealand

References

External links
New Zealand Walking Access Commission's official website
Walking Access Act 2008

Public sector in New Zealand